The .338 Remington Ultra Magnum is a .338 caliber rifle cartridge introduced by Remington Arms in 2002.

Design
It is a beltless, rebated rim cartridge based on the .300 Remington Ultra Magnum case shortened .090" and necked-up to accept a 0.338-inch (.338 caliber) bullet. The .338 Remington Ultra Magnum has a similar case capacity as the .338 Lapua Magnum and somewhat lower than that of the .338-378 Weatherby Magnum.  It is one of the most powerful .338-caliber rounds in production.

Because this cartridge already operates at very high pressures (65,000 PSI), handloaders cannot realize significant velocity improvements over factory ammunition as many handloaders have done over the years with more conventional, lower pressure rounds.  However, they can still tune their own loads for best precision in their specific rifles, as with any other cartridge.

See also
 List of rifle cartridges
 Table of handgun and rifle cartridges
 .338 Edge

References

External links

.338 Remington Ultra Magnum reloading data at accuratepowder.com BROKEN
.338 Remington Ultra Magnum case diagram

Pistol and rifle cartridges
Magnum rifle cartridges
Remington Ultra Magnum rifle cartridges